John Henry Meibusch (11 December 1874 - 17 February 1955) was a rugby union player who represented in the Australia national rugby union team.

Meibusch, a prop, was born in Surat, Queensland and claimed one international rugby cap for Australia, playing against Great Britain, at Sydney, on 30 July 1904. His younger brother Lou Meibusch also made a Wallaby appearance in 1912.

References

Australian rugby union players
Australia international rugby union players
Year of death uncertain
1874 births
1955 deaths
Rugby union players from Queensland
Rugby union props